Legend 3D was an American stereoscopic conversion studio and multimedia company.

Founded in 2001, the company produces 3D conversion and visual effects work. In November 2016, Legend 3D moved into its facility on the Columbia Square campus in Hollywood, CA.  In October 2017, the company announced it was expanding its presence with a new facility in Pune, India. In February 2018, Toronto Star reported that the Toronto division of Legend3D has downsized its work force to about 100 employees. The liberal government had previously announced that it will allocate provincial government fund for $3.1 million to the L.A firm to create 271 new jobs while retaining 280 positions in its Toronto office. When the government announced the funds for Legend, the company also pledged to invest $27 million in the Toronto office. The Ontario government says its officials are now “working with Legend 3D to confirm that they are following the terms of our contract."

As of March 2019, The Toronto office has been silently shuttered and staff have been laid off after finding more cost effective labour in India. The executive team has also been replaced once again.

As of December 2021, Legend has filed for bankruptcy.

Company history
Barry Sandrew, Ph.D., founded Legend Films in 2001, originally as a colorization studio, building on the patents from American Film Technologies where he served as CTO from 1986-1991. In 1985, Barry left his position as staff neuroscientist at Harvard and Mass General Hospital and pioneered the first all-digital technology and process for colorizing black and white films. The company produced colorized product for Fox Home Entertainment, Universal Pictures, Turner, Paramount, Sony, Japan's Tsuburaya, BBC and several other major global media and distribution companies. In 2010, following the release of Alice in Wonderland, he changed the name of Legend Films to Legend 3D, and colorization took on a low priority in order for the company to focus entirely on the stereoscopic conversion of feature films and commercials.

The stereoscopic conversion industry went through a Wild West of development with each of the 3 big conversion studios developing their own proprietary software to get through the incredible amount of content delivered in the peak of 3D. Legend was known for having incredibly high quality and low margins due to sales executives underbidding each other between the competing studios. Legend was known for doing a lot of work with Disney and Sony, while their main rival StereoD, was known for capturing all market around Universal, Legendary Pictures, Marvel, and ILM. In late 2014, the company expanded to create two additional lines of business: Legend VFX, providing visual effects, and Legend VR, offering pre- and post-production services for the creation of virtual reality experiences. Late 2014 is when a temporary studio was built up out of the Sheridan College's rentable conferences room ON, Canada. This led to the downsizing of the Carlsbad branch. This temporary location was strategically placed to recruit college students. This along with many other reasons caused key executives at the studio to depart the studio due to disagreements with investors over where the industry should go.

In September 2017, the company opened a facility in Pune, India. In December 2017, the company opened another facility in Luoyang, China, which hosts over 100 members.

In December 2021, Legend3D holdings has closed all locations and filled for bankruptcy.

Visual Effects Services
Legend's teams in Asia Pacific allow for plate preparation & augmentation. The RPM department's work allows for streaming episodics and feature films.

Downsizing and closing of Toronto Facility 
In February 2018, Toronto Star reported that the Toronto division of Legend3D has downsized its work force to about 100 employees. The liberal government had previously announced that it will allocate provincial government fund for $3.1 million to the L.A firm to create 271 new jobs while retaining 280 positions in its Toronto office. When the government announced the funds for Legend, the company also pledged to invest $27 million in the Toronto office. The Ontario government says its officials are now “working with Legend 3D to confirm that they are following the terms of our contract."

The terms of the contract were never fulfilled and the office was closed March 2019.

Notable releases

Films converted to 3D 
Varisu (2023) - theatrical release
Ponniyin Selvan: I (2022) - theatrical release
Cobra (2022) - theatrical release
RRR (2022) - theatrical release
Etharkkum Thunindhavan (2022) - theatrical release
Valimai (2022) - theatrical release
Pushpa: The Rise (2021) - theatrical release
Pelli SandaD (2021) - theatrical release
Eternals (2021) - theatrical release
Shang-Chi and the Legend of the Ten Rings (2021) - theatrical release
Black Widow (2021) - theatrical release
Vakeel Saab (2021) - theatrical release
Gaddalakonda Ganesh (2019) - theatrical release
Bigil (2019) - theatrical release
Gemini Man (2019) - theatrical release
Maharshi (2019) - theatrical release
NTR: Kathanayakudu (2019) - theatrical release
Spider-Man: Far From Home (2019) - theatrical release
Detective Pikachu (2019) - theatrical release
Avengers: Endgame (2019) - theatrical release
Captain Marvel (2019) - theatrical release
Zero (2018) - theatrical release
Ant-Man and the Wasp (2018) - theatrical release
The Meg (2018) - theatrical release
Alpha (2018) - theatrical release
A Wrinkle in Time (2018) - theatrical release
Black Panther (2018) - theatrical release
My Little Pony: The Movie (2017) - theatrical release
Spider-Man: Homecoming (2017) - theatrical release
Pirates of the Caribbean: Dead Men Tell No Tales (2017) - theatrical release
King Arthur: Legend of the Sword (2017) - theatrical release
Ghostbusters: Answer the Call (2016) - theatrical release
Suicide Squad (2016) - theatrical release
Pete's Dragon (2016) - theatrical release
Passengers (2016) - theatrical release
The Hunger Games: Mockingjay - Part 2 (2015) - theatrical release
Goosebumps (2015) - theatrical release
The Walk (2015) - theatrical release
Enchanted Kingdom (2015) - theatrical release
Ant-Man (2015) - theatrical release
Poltergeist (2015) - theatrical release
Insurgent (2015) - theatrical release
Jupiter Ascending (2015) - theatrical release
Maleficent (2014) - theatrical release
Transformers: Age of Extinction (2014) - theatrical release
The Amazing Spider-Man 2 (2014) - theatrical release
The Lego Movie (2014) - theatrical release
Metallica Through the Never (2013) - theatrical release
Man of Steel (2013) - theatrical release
The Smurfs 2 (2013) - theatrical release
The Little Mermaid 3D (2013) - theatrical release
Oz: The Great and Powerful (2013) - theatrical release
Top Gun 3D (2013) - theatrical 3D re-release and Blu-ray 3D release
3D Classics: March of the Wooden Soldiers in 3D (2012) - Blu-ray 3D release
3D Classics: The Little Rascals in 3D (2012) - Blu-ray 3D release
3D Classics: The Three Stooges in 3D (2012) - Blu-ray 3D release
Life of Pi (2012) - theatrical release
The Amazing Spider-Man (2012) - theatrical release
Ghost Rider: Spirit of Vengeance (2012) - theatrical release
Hugo (2011) - theatrical release
The Smurfs (2011) - theatrical release
Transformers: Dark of the Moon (2011) - theatrical release
Green Lantern (2011) - theatrical release
Pirates of the Caribbean: On Stranger Tides (2011) - theatrical release
Priest (2011) - theatrical release
The Green Hornet (2011) - theatrical release
Shrek, Shrek 2 and Shrek the Third (2010) - Blu-ray 3D release
Alice in Wonderland (2010) - theatrical release

Commercials
In 2008, Legend converted a commercial for Skittles candy for the M&M/Mars Company

Special events
Legend performed 3D conversion of large-screen video material for the This Is It concerts.

References

External links
Official website

Mass media companies established in 2001
DVD companies of the United States
Film distributors of the United States